Joshua Kearney Millner (5 July 1847 – 16 November 1931), also referred to as Jerry Millner, was an Irish shooter who represented Great Britain and Ireland at the 1908 Summer Olympics. He won a gold medal in the Free rifle at 1000 yards. At the time he was 61 years and 4 days old, making him one of the oldest gold medalists ever. He also finished 9th in the single-shot running deer event and 15th in the double-shot running deer event.

Miller was an officer in the 8th (Militia) Battalion of the King's Royal Rifle Corps, formerly the Carlow Rifles. He was appointed a captain on 18 August 1888, was promoted to major in early 1902, and received the honorary rank of lieutenant-colonel on 23 August 1902. Only two months later he received the substantive rank of lieutenant-colonel as he was appointed in command of the battalion on 5 November 1902.

References

External links
 profile

1847 births
1931 deaths
British male sport shooters
Irish male sport shooters
ISSF rifle shooters
Running target shooters
Olympic shooters of Great Britain
Shooters at the 1908 Summer Olympics
Olympic gold medallists for Great Britain
Sportspeople from Dublin (city)
Olympic medalists in shooting
Medalists at the 1908 Summer Olympics